Arani is a residential area and suburb of Chennai, India, located on the banks of the Arani river.

Surroundings

References

Neighbourhoods in Chennai